The following is a list of notable people who were significantly involved in the 2022 Canada convoy protests:

Coutts protest 

 Artur Pawlowski

Ottawa protest

Citizens, journalists and justice system 

 Peter Sloly (police)

 James Bowie (lawyer)

 Zexi Li (citizen)

 Caryma Sa'd (citizen-journalist)
 William Komer (videographer)

Donors and protestors 

 Christopher John Barber 
 James Bauder
 Brigitte Belton
 Maggie Hope Braun
 Daniel Bulford
 Benjamin Dichter
 Romana Didulo
 Randy Hillier
 Pat King
 Tamara Lich
 Jeremy MacKenzie
 Tom Marazzo
 Tyson Billings

Public Order Emergency Commission 

 Brendan Miller
 Paul Rouleau

Lists of people by association
Lists of 21st-century people
Canada-related lists
Canada convoy protest